Verpa is a genus of ascomycete fungi related to the morels. Resembling the latter genus in edibility and form, the common name early morels is popular. There are five species in the widespread genus.

Verpa comes from the Latin for erection or little rod (also a vulgarity for phallus).   Edibility of Verpa is the same as for Morchella, and are safe if cooked.   Gyromitra, by contrast has a couple of dangerously toxic species being Gyromitra esculenta and Gyromitra ambigua.

Analysis of the ribosomal DNA of many of the Pezizales showed the genus Verpa to be closely related to the genus Morchella, and also Disciotis. Thus the three genera are now included in the family Morchellaceae.

Species
Species include: 
 
Verpa bohemica - early morel.

 Edible if cooked. Found in North America, in  early spring, April–May in damp  places, under poplar
 
Verpa conica - bell or conic morel.

 Edible if cooked. Found in North America, in orchards, in eastern Canada.
Verpa digitaliformis
Verpa krombholzii
Verpa speciosa

See also
Mushroom
Morels
Morchellaceae

References

External links

California Fungi: Verpa conica
Roger's Mushrooms: Verpa bohemica

Morchellaceae
Pezizales genera